Amarna letter EA 100, titled: "The City of Irqata to the King" is a short-, to moderate-length clay tablet Amarna letter from the city-state of Irqata, (modern Arqa), written to the Pharaoh of Egypt. Only one other city sent a clay tablet Amarna letter to the Pharaoh, namely Tunip, letter EA 59, titled: "From the Citizens of Tunip".

The letter concerns the "watch-guarding" of Irqata, regional warfare (with the Habiru/'Apiru), and the city's continued protection, and loyalty to the Egyptian Pharaoh. The letter implies their loyalty, their constant vigilance, and need for assistance from the Pharaoh, either implied by troop needs, or at least awareness from the Pharaoh, of their needs.

EA 100 is located at the British Museum, no 29825. Tablet letter EA 100 can be viewed here: Obverse: , Reverse: .

The letter

EA 100: "The City of Irqata to the King"
EA 100, letter one of one from the elders of city-state Irqata. (Not a linear, line-by-line translation.)

Obverse:

(Lines 1-10)--This tablet is a tablet from Irqata (Arqa). To the king, our lord: Message from Irqata and its el(d)ers.1 We fall at the feet of the king, our lord, 7 times and 7 times. To our lord, the Sun: Message from Irqata. May the heart of the king, (our) lord, know2 that we guard Irqata for him.
Paragraph II
(11-18)--When the [ki]ng, our lord, sent D[UMU-Bi-Ha-A, he said to [u]s, "Message of the king: Guard Irqata!"3 The sons of the traitor to the king seek our harm;4 Irqata see[ks]5 loyalty to the king.
Paragraph III
(19-22)--As to [silver] having been given to S[u]baru (Sú-ba-ru) al[ong with] 30 horses and cha[riots],

Reverse:

Paragraph III-B
(23)--May you know the mind of Irqata!
(24-32)--When a tablet from the king arrived (saying) to ra[id] the land that the 'A[piru ] had taken [from] the king, they wa[ged] war with us against the enemy of our lord, the man whom you pla[ced] over us.6 Truly we are guarding the l[and].7 May the king, our lord, heed the words of his loyal servants.
Paragraph IV
(33-44)--May he grant a gift to his servant(s) so our enemies will see this and eat dirt.8 May the breath of the king not depart from us.9 We shall keep the city gate barred until the breath of the king reaches us. Severe is the war against us — terribly, terribly.--(complete, only very minor lacunas, lines 1-44)

The Habiru/'Apiru

The mention of the Habiru shows the conflict of the time, as the takeover of city-states or regions by the Habiru. The map shows various cities and regions, and their respective dealings with the Habiru. (There are only 3 letters from Labaya of Šakmu/Shechem.) The next closest mention of the Habiru is from the Jerusalem letters of Abdi-Heba, directly south at Jerusalem, letters EA 286, 287, 288, 289, and EA 290.

Spellings for Habiru in the Amarna letters

EA 100, l. 26—KUR,.. ša ìl-qú LÚ.MEŠ GAZ,.. [ ištu ]–.]–( LÚ-MEŠ GAZ )
EA 271, l. 16—..lú-meš Sa-GaZ-meš .. ( Men (pl), SA.GAZMEŠ(pl)
EA 290, l. 24—..Ha-Pí-Ri .. ( Hapiru ( 'Apiru ))
EA 299, l. 18—..da-an-nu LÚ-SA-GAZ-meš .. ( "Strengthening" - LÚ.SA.GAZ.MEŠ ..( "Strengthening Habiru" )
EA 366, l. 21—.. {LÚ} SA-GAZ .. ( LÚSA-GAZ (Habiru))

Akkadian text
Text: Akkadian language, sumerograms, Egyptianisms, etc.

Akkadian: 

Obverse: Paragraph I
(Line 1)—Ṭup-pí an-nu-ú,.. ṭup-pí–.–.–.–.–.–.–(Tablet this,.. tablet (of)- )
(2)— _URU_-IR-Qa-Ta,.. a-na (lugal=ŠÀR-ru)_LUGAL_-ri–.–.–(-City-state-Irqata-(Arqa),.. to (the)-King—!.. ) 
(3)— _EN_-nu,.. um-ma,.. _URU_-IR-Qa-Ta–.–(Lord-Ours,.. "message thus",.. Quote-City-state-Irqata—!..-- )
(4)—ù _LÚ.MEŠ_ ši-bu(!)-ti-ši,..–.–.–.–.–.–.–.–.–(--and MEN(pl) elders,..—! )
(5)—ana _GÌR.MEŠ_,.. -_LUGAL_-ri _EN_-nuUnquote,..–.–(at (the) Feet(pl),.. "King-Lord-Ours",.. )
(6)—7 šu,.. 7 ta-an-ni,.. am-qú-ut!..–.–.–.–.–.–(7 times,.. (and) 7 'times again',.. we bow—!,.. )(?we address you?UnQuote)
(7)—ana EN(=Bēlu)-nu,.. An-UTU,.. umma--–.(.. To Lord-Ours,.. God-"Sun-God",.. "message thus"-(of) -- )
(8)—URU-IR-Qa-Ta!.. "i-de ŠÀ(=lìb)-bi"–.–.–(..City-state-Irqata—!.. ..Quote"Know (in the)-HEART (of the)" -- )
(9)—LUGAL EN,.. i-nu-ma ni-na-ṣa-ru–.–.–( --King-Lord—!..  .."Now (-at-this-time)" (we) 'Watch-Guard' -- )
(10)—URU-IR-Qa-Ta,.. ana ša-šu—!...–.–.–.–.–(City-state-Irqata,.. for Him—!"UnQuote ....(i.e. for the Pharaoh) )

(Line 1)--(Tablet this,.. tablet- )
(2)--(-City-state-Irqata-(Arqa),.. to (the)-QuoteKing—!.. )
(3)--(-Bēlu-nuUnquote,.. "umma",.. City-Irqata—!.. )
(4)--(ù LÚ.MEŠ-(šību)"the elders"—!.. ) 
(5)--(ana šêpu(meš),.. "LUGAL(=ŠÀR-ru)-Bēlu-nu",.. )
(6)--(7 šu (ù) 7 ta-an-ni, maqātu!.. )
(7)--(ana Bēlu-nu,.. d-UTU,.. umma --)
(8)--(City-Irqata!.. .."Idû (in the)-ŠÀ(=lìb)-bi (=libbu)" -- )
(9)--(LUGAL EN!..  ..Inūma(=enūma) naṣāru -- )
(10)--(-City-Irqata,.. ana šâšu!.... )

Paragraph I–Cuneiform score, Akkadian, English

1.Ṭup-pí an-nu-ú,.. ṭup-pí
___țuppu annû, – țuppu
___(Tablet this,.. tablet (of)- )
2._URU_ -IR-Qa-Ta,.. a-na (lugal=ŠÀR-ru)_LUGAL_-ri
URU_ -IR-Qa-Ta,.. ana (lugal=ŠÀR-ru)_LUGAL_-ri
___(-City-Irqata,.. to King(=ŠÀR-ru)- )
3._EN_-nu,.. um-ma,.. Quote_URU_-IR-Qa-Ta
___ _EN_-nu,.. – umma,.. _URU_-IR-Qa-Ta—!
___(_Lord_-Ours,.. – "message thus",.. Quote-City-state-Irqata—!..-- )
4.ù _LÚ.MEŠ_ ši-bu(!)-ti-ši,..
___u _LÚ.MEŠ_ ši-bu(!)-ti-ši (šību),..
___(and (_LÚ.MEŠ_)-(šību)"the elders"—!.. )
5.ana _GÌR.MEŠ,.. Quote-LUGAL_-ri _EN_-nuUnquote,..
šību
___(at (the) Feet(pl),.. "King-Lord-Ours",.. )
6.
___(and) 7 'times again',.. we bow!,.. )(?we address you?UnQuote)
7.
___(.. To Lord-Ours,.. God-"Sun-God",.. "message thus"-(of) -- )

segue:
Paragraph II
(11)—I-nu-ma yu-wa-ši-ra,.. LUGAL,..–.–.–.–("Now-(at-this-time)",.. sent,.. (the) King- )
(12)—EN-nu,.. 1.diš-DUMU-Bi-Ha-A,.. Ù–.–.–(..-Lord-Ours,.. 1.-DUMU(son(=compatriot))-Bi-Ha-A,.. And,.. )
(13)—yi-iq-bi,.. ana ia-ši-nu–.–.–.–.–.–(..He said,.. to us,.. )
(14)—QuoteUmma LUGAL,.. Ú-ṣa-ru-mi–.–(Quote"Message thus" (the) King,.. Guard!.. )
(15)—URU-IR-Qa-Ta!..Unquote .. DUMU.MEŠ,.. )--(City-state-Irqata!Unquote.. "Sons"(Compatriots),.. )
(16)—LÚ-ša-ri LUGAL-ri–.–.–.–.–.–(of the traitor,.. (of the)King,.. )
(17)—tu-ba-ú-na-nu!..–.–.–.–.–.–("seek harm"(attack/'to rise up')!.. )
(18)—URU-IR-Qa-Ta,.. tu-a-[-ú!.. ]–.–(City-Irqata,.. "seeks loyalty"!..(="to be good") )

(11)--(Inūma aṣû/uššuru,.. LUGAL(=ŠÀR-ru)- )
(12)--(Bēlu-nu,.. 1. DUMU-Bi-Ha-A,.. Ù,.. )
(13)--(..qabû,.. ana iāši,.. )
(14)--(Quote"Umma" (the) LUGAL: Naṣāru!.. )
(15)--(City-Irqata!..Unquote .. DUMU.MEŠ (of),.. )
(16)--(LÚ-ša-ri,.. (of the)-Šarru,.. )
(17)--(tebû-("us")!.. )
(18)--(City-Irqata,.. tâbu!... )

Paragraph II–Cuneiform score, Akkadian, English

Cuneiform score (per CDLI, Chicago Digital Library Initiative), and Akkadian, and English.

segue:

Paragraph-(lines 11-18)

11.I-nu-ma yu-wa-ši-ra#,.. LUGAL#
___(Inūma aṣû/uššuru,.. LUGAL(=ŠÀR-ru)- )
___("Now-(at-this-time)",.. sent-(by),.. (the) King- )
12._en_-nu,.. 1=m=diš1.diš "1=[ _DUMU_ ]-Bi-Ha-A,.. [ ù ]
___(Bēlu-nu,.. "1. DUMU-Bi-Ha-A",.. u,.. )
___(..-Lord-Ours,.. 1.-DUMU(son(=Compatriot))-Bi-Ha-A,.. And,.. )
Subsection 2 of 5
12.8---------[ Ù ]
___-------------u
___---------(.. And,.. )
13.yi-iq-bi,.. a-na ia-[ ši ]-nu#
___(..qabû,.. ana iāši,.. )
___(..(He) said,.. to us,.. )

Subsection 3 of 5
14.QuoteUmma LUGAL,.. ú#-ṣa-ru-mi# 
___(Quote"Umma" (the) LUGAL: Naṣāru!.. )
___(Quote"Message thus" (the) King,.. Guard!.. )
15.URU-IR-Qa-Ta dumu-meš#–!
___(City-Irqata!..Unquote .. DUMU.MEŠ (of),.. )
___(City-state-Irqata!Unquote.. "Sons"(Compatriots),.. )
Subsection 4 of 5
15.6--------( DUMU.MEŠ# )
___-----------( DUMU.MEŠ 
___------——---(.."Sons"(Compatriots),.. )
16.LÚ-ša-ri LUGAL-ri
___(LÚ-ša-ri,.. (of the)-Šarru,.. )
___(of the traitor,.. (of the)King,.. )
17.tu-ba-ú-na-nu–
___(tebû-("us")?2nd-Unquote?!–!.. )
___("seek harm"(attack/'to rise up')?2nd-Unquote?!–!.. )
Subsection 5 of 5
18.URU-IR-Qa-Ta,.. tu-a-[-ú#––.. ]
___City-Irqata,.. tâbu–!... )
___(City-Irqata,.. "seeks loyalty"–!..(="to be good") )–!

Paragraph-(lines 19-32)
Paragraph III
(19)—Ki-ta a-na,.. LUGAL-ri,..–.–.–.–(As to(Whether),.. King,.. )
(20)—i-nu-ma,.. na-ad-nu  [ x  a-na,.. –.–.("Now-(at-this-time)",.. "having given"("to throw/cast"),.. (x="silver"),.. to,.. )
(21)—KUR (land Sumerogram)|KUR]]-Sú-Ba-Ri,.. qa-du,..–.–.–.–.–.–(Land-Subaru,.. "handed over",.. )
(22)—(3x(u) ANŠE.KUR.RA.MEŠ [ (ù) giš-GIGIR.MEŠ ]–.–(30 Horses [ (and) chariots ],.. )

(19)--(Kī ana,.. LUGAL-ri(ŠÀR-ri),.. )
(20)--(inūma,.. nadû  [ x ana ],.. )
(21)--(KUR-Su-Ba-Ri,.. qātu.. )
(22)--(30 ANŠE.KUR.RA.MEŠ [ (ù) (GIŠ).GIGIR.MEŠ ],.. )

(end Obverse)

Reverse: 
Paragraph III (cont.)
(23)—Ti-de,.. ŠÀ(=lìb)-bi URU-IR-Qa-Ta!..–.–.–(..Know,.. (the) mind(=heart) (of)-City-Irqata!.. ) 
segue: 
(24)—I-nu-ma,.. ka-ši-id –.–.–.–.–.–(.."Now-(when)",.. "arrived"("emplaced"),.. )
(25)—ṭup-pí,.. LUGAL QuoteA-na ša-[ -ha-at ]--(..tablet (of the) King,.. Quote"To Raid"("to strip") -- )
(26)—KUR,.. ša ìl-qú LÚ.MEŠ GAZ,.. [ ištu ]–.–(LAND,..  which "taken" (by) LÚ.MEŠ-("Habiru")(gaz),.. [ from ])
(27)—LUGAL-ri,..Unquote i-te9-ep-pi-[ -šu ]–.–( (the) King,..Unquote "waging war"("attack"-ing) -- )
(28)—nu-KÚR,.. it-ti-nu,.. ana KÚR–.–.–(..(in) War(fare),.. "with-us"(against-us),.. by (the)ENEMY,.. )
(29)—EN-nu,.. LÚ ti-ìš-ta-[ -pár-šu ]–.–( (of) Lord-Ours,.. (The)-MAN,.. "emplaced",.. )
(30)—UGU-nu,.. adi ni-na-ṣa-ru,.. ki–.–("OVER-us",.. "until" "guarding",.. "as if" )
segue:
(31)—yi-ìš-mé,.. LUGAL-ru EN-nu,.. –.–(Hear("Listen"),.. King-Lord-Ours,.. )
(32)—a-wa-te,.. ARAD.MEŠ ki-ti-šu,.. –.–((the) 'words'("explanations") (of) SERVANT-S(pl)-yours!.. )

segue:
(23)--(..Idû,.. (the) ŠÀ(=lìb)(=heart) (of)-City-Irqata!.. )
segue: 
(24)--(Inūma,.. kašādu -- )
(25)--(ṭuppu LUGAL(ŠÀRru),.. QuoteAna Šahāṭu -- )
(26)--(KUR,.. ša leqû (by) LÚ.MEŠ "Habiru"(gaz),.. ištu -- )
(27)--( ŠÀR-ri(Šarru),..Unquote tabû -- )
(28)--(nukurtu,..itti-nu,.. ana nukurtu -- )
(29)--(Bēlu-nu,.. "emplaced" -- )
(30)--(--UGU-nu(eli/muhhi-nu),.. adi naṣāru,.. kî,.. )
segue:
(31)--(Hear("Listen"),.. King-Lord-Ours,.. )
(32)--((the) amatu,.. ARAD.MEŠ-kâti!.. )

Paragraph III–Cuneiform score, Akkadian, English

Cuneiform score (per CDLI, Chicago Digital Library Initiative), and Akkadian, and English.

Paragraph-(lines 33-43)

Paragraph IV
(33)—Ù,.. ia-di-na,.. NÍG-BA,.. –.–( ..And,.. (may) he ("grant"))"know",.. GIFTS,.. )
(34)—ana ARAD-šu,.. ù,.. ti-da-ga-lu,.. –(to SERVANTS-his,.. and,.. (see)"to look",.. )
(35)—LÚ.MEŠ, a-ia-bu-nu ù,.. –.–.–.–(MEN(pl), "enemies"?,.. and,.. ) 
(36)—ti-ka-lu ep-ra!... ša-ri–.–.–.–.–(..Eat Dirt!.. (May the)-Breath,.. )
(37)—LUGAL-ri,.. ú-ul ti-na-mu-uš--(..(of the) King,.. Not "depart"(leave),.. )
(38)—iš-tu mu-hi-nu,..–.–.–.–.–.–(from "upon us"!.. )
(39)—a-bu-la nu-ú-du-lu,.. a-di,..–((The)-"City-Gate" "is barred",.. until,.. )
(40)—ka-ša-di,.. ša-ri–.–.–.–.–(..("emplaced")"Returned,.. (the)-Breath,.. )
(41)—LUGAL,.. ana ia-ši-nu –.–(..(of the) King,.. for Us!.. )
segue:
(42)—kal-ga,.. nu-KÚR,.. UGU-nu!.. –(..("All")Severe,.. Warfare,.. UPON-us!.. )
(43)—[ ma-]-GAL!.. ma-GAL!.. –.–("Strongly",.. "Strongly",.. (Terribly!.. Terribly!...) )

(33)--( ..Ù,.. idû?,.. NÍG-BA,.. )
(34)--(ana ARAD-šu,.. ǜ,.. dagālu,.. )
(35)--(LÚ.MEŠ(pl), a-ia-bu-nu,.. ù,.. )
(36)--(akālu eperu!... Šāru,.. )
(37)--(LUGAL-ri(ŠÀR-ri),.. ul tamû,.. )
(38)--(ištu muhhu!... )
(39)--(Abullu  xxx,.. adi )
(40)--(kašāda,..  šāru,.. )
(41)--(LUGAL,.. ana iāši-nu,.. )
segue:
(42)--(kalu,.. nukurtu,.. UGU-nu,.. )
(43)--(magal!.. magal!... )

Paragraph IV–Cuneiform score, Akkadian, English

Cuneiform score (per CDLI, Chicago Digital Library Initiative), and Akkadian, and English.

Paragraph-(lines 33-43)

38.iš-tu mu-hi-nu
39.a-bu-la nu-ú-du-lu,.. a-di
40.ka-ša-di,.. ša-ri
___(kašādu,..  šāru,.. )
___("emplaced")"Returned,.. (the)-Breath,.. )
41. ..LUGAL#,.. a-na ia-ši-nu
__(LUGAL,.. ana iāši-nu,.. )
__(..(of the) King,.. for Us!.. )
segue:
42.kal#-ga,.. nu-kúr,.. UGU-nu
___(kalu,.. nukurtu,.. UGU-nu,.. ) – !
___(..("All")Severe,.. Warfare,.. UPON-us.. ) – !
43.[ ma-]-gal ma-gal
___magal – !, magal – !
___("Strongly",.. "Strongly",.. (Terribly – !.. Terribly – !...) )

See also
Arqa (city-state Irqata)
Amarna letter EA 59 (city-state Tunip)
Amarna letters–phrases and quotations

References

Moran, William L. The Amarna Letters. Johns Hopkins University Press, 1987, 1992. (softcover)
 Parpola, 1971. The Standard Babylonian Epic of Gilgamesh, Parpola, Simo, Neo-Assyrian Text Corpus Project, c 1997, Tablet I through Tablet XII, Index of Names, Sign List, and Glossary-(pp. 119–145), 165 pages.

External links

Photo, EA 100: Obverse
Photo, EA 100: Reverse
Obverse (photo only)
Reverse (photo only)
Line Drawing, cuneiform, and Akkadian, EA 100: Obverse & Reverse, CDLI no. P270927 (Chicago Digital Library Initiative)
Link to all 382 EA Amarna letters, ( Chicago Digital Library Initiative )

Version history (cuneiform) 
 Cuneiform, line-by-line, ( Chicago Digital Library Initiative )

Amarna letters
Ancient Lebanon